The Shore of Salvation is a 1990 USSR-North Korean two-part martial arts action film directed by Arya Dashiyev and Ryu Ho Son. The film describes the events of the Russo-Japanese War.

Plot
The events unfold on the cruiser "Svetlana", one of the Russian ships that participated in the fighting of the Russo-Japanese war. The cruiser is attacked. After the fire is over, the crew decides to flood the ship so that it does not get to the enemy. Only five sailors can survive. They arrive on Korean land and are sent to the Russian territory, on the way they face various dangers.

Cast
Dmitry Matveyev — Dyakonov
Boris Nevzorov — Nikulin
Viktor Stepanov — Father Fyodor
Vitaly Serov — Oles
Alexander Slastin — Myakota
Lee Sol Hi — Barame
Li Yong Ho — Yu Chun
Cho Jae-Yong — elder
Yun Chang — Kajio
Zhu Sok Bon — Yam
Kwak Men So — Harata

References

External links

North Korean drama films
Soviet action films
1990 martial arts films
1990 films
Soviet multilingual films
1990 multilingual films
Films about the Russian Empire
Films set in the Korean Empire